Hope Kodzo Avayevu (born 19 October 2002) is a Ghanaian professional footballer who plays as a midfielder for USL League One club North Texas SC.

Club career
Born in Accra, Avayevu began his career in the Ghana Football Association ran Faith Soccer Academy before joining Bechem United. In 2019, he traveled to the United States with Bechem United and participated in the Dallas Cup where he was invited to stay and train with Major League Soccer club FC Dallas. On 20 November 2020, Avayevu signed a professional contract with FC Dallas reserve club, North Texas SC.

He made his professional debut for North Texas SC on 24 April 2021 in their USL League One opening match against Fort Lauderdale CF, starting in the 4–2 victory.

Career statistics

References

External links
 Profile at FC Dallas

2002 births
Living people
Footballers from Accra
Ghanaian footballers
Association football midfielders
North Texas SC players
USL League One players
Ghanaian expatriate footballers
Expatriate soccer players in the United States
MLS Next Pro players